Hartham Weir (also known colloquially as Two-step Weir) is a small weir on the River Lea next to the confluence of the River Beane/Lea, on the edge of Hartham Common, Hertford, England.

Design
The weir was installed to let the river travel over a main sewer pipe.

Uses
It is frequented by the Herts Canoe Club and local anglers.

2008 rebuild
The weir was demolished and rebuilt in 2008, costing £310,000.

Local MP Mark Prisk and Herts Canoe Club re-opened the weir in a ceremony on Saturday, 25 October 2008.

Old Weir Gallery

References

External links

Weirs on the River Lea
Weirs in Hertfordshire